A minibar is a small fridge commonly found in hotel rooms. 

Minibar may also refer to:

 miniBar, a cocktail bar in Boston's Copley Square Hotel
 Minibar, British band which backed Pete Yorn
 minibar by José Andrés, Washington D.C., one of the José Andrés restaurants
 Minibar (Chicago), gay bar that operated from 2005 to 2016

See also
 Minbar (disambiguation)